Daniel Longfellow Plumer (July 3, 1837 – November 20, 1920) was an American businessman from Wausau, Wisconsin who served a single one-year term as a member of the Wisconsin State Assembly and held other public offices. He was the brother of B. G. Plumer.

Background 
He was born in Epping, New Hampshire, on July 3, 1837, son of Abraham and Sarah Longfellow (Cilley) Plumer. He was educated in Epping and Nottingham, New Hampshire and at the New London Academy, a coeducational secondary school. After leaving the Academy, Plumer studied civil engineering.

He came to Wisconsin in 1857 and settled in Wausau and did work as a surveyor in that part of Wisconsin, becoming familiar with the natural resources of the region. He went into business in lumber and real estate, and served as an agent for Marshall & Ilsley of Milwaukee. He, Willis Silverthorn and Willis' brother George went into banking themselves as Silverthorn & Plumer in 1869.

On September 13, 1869 he married Mary Jane Draper of Otsego County, New York at Schenevus, New York. They would have only one child, a son who died in infancy.

Public offices 
Plumer served for some years as Marathon County Surveyor and on the county board of supervisors. He was also on Wausau's Village board.

Like his brother, he was known as a Democrat, but he was elected in 1872 to the same Assembly seat his brother had held as a member of the Liberal Reform Party, a short-lived coalition of Democrats, reform and Liberal Republicans, and Grangers, succeeding Democrat Bartholomew Ringle. He was succeeded the next year by his partner Willis Silverthorn, also a Democrat.

Plumer served as mayor of Wausau in 1878 and 1882-1883.

Later years 
In 1882 the Silverthorn & Plumer Bank incorporated as the First National Bank of Wausau, with Plumer remaining president as he had since its organization. He was president of the Northern Chief Iron Company, which owned extensive iron ore mines on the Gogebic Range. 
  
He died in Wausau, Wisconsin on November 20, 1920 after a long illness.

Notes

1837 births
1920 deaths
People from Epping, New Hampshire
Politicians from Wausau, Wisconsin
Businesspeople from Wisconsin
County supervisors in Wisconsin
Wisconsin city council members
Mayors of places in Wisconsin
Democratic Party members of the Wisconsin State Assembly
Wisconsin Reformers (19th century)
19th-century American politicians
Colby–Sawyer College alumni